East Genoa Methodist Episcopal Church is a historic Methodist Episcopal church located at Genoa in Cayuga County, New York. It is a hand hewn timber-frame structure, sheathed in pine clapboard, and built in 1849 in the  Greek Revival style.  High Victorian Gothic modifications were made in the 1880s.

It was listed on the National Register of Historic Places in 2002.

References

External links

Churches on the National Register of Historic Places in New York (state)
Methodist churches in New York (state)
Greek Revival church buildings in New York (state)
Churches completed in 1849
Churches in Cayuga County, New York
1849 establishments in New York (state)
National Register of Historic Places in Cayuga County, New York